Alex Jaeger is an American art director.

Filmography
1996: Star Trek: First Contact, visual effects art director
1997: Starship Troopers, visual effects art director
2003: Hulk,  visual effects art director
2007: Transformers, visual effects art director
2010: Iron Man 2, visual effects art director
2012: The Hunger Games, visual effects art director
2012: The Avengers, visual effects art director
2013: Pacific Rim,  visual effects art director

References

Year of birth missing (living people)
Living people
American art directors